Longmire is a crime drama series that premiered on A&E Network on June 3, 2012, before moving to Netflix in 2015 and completing its run on November 17, 2017. The series was based on the Longmire mystery novels written by best-selling author Craig Johnson, and follows Walt Longmire (Robert Taylor), the sheriff of the fictional Absaroka County, Wyoming, as he returns to work following the death of his wife.

Series overview

Episodes

Season 1 (2012)

Season 2 (2013)

Season 3 (2014)

Season 4 (2015)

Season 5 (2016)

Season 6 (2017)

References

External links
 
 

Lists of American crime drama television series episodes
Lists of American Western (genre) television series episodes